Mauro Isidro Contreras Hernández (born January 15, 1996) is a Mexican professional footballer who plays as a midfielder for Zacatepec on loan from Liga MX club C.D. Guadalajara.

Career
He made his official debut under Argentine coach Matias Almeyda against Cruz Azul on 22 April 2017.

Honours

Club
Guadalajara
Liga MX: Clausura 2017
Copa MX: Clausura 2017

References

External links
 

1996 births
Living people
Footballers from Jalisco
Association football wingers
C.D. Guadalajara footballers
Club Atlético Zacatepec players
Liga MX players
Mexican footballers